Párnica is a village and municipality in Dolný Kubín District in the Zilina Region of northern Slovakia.

History
In historical records the village was first mentioned in 1420.

Geography
The municipality lies at an altitude of 458 metres and covers an area of 50.405 km². It has a population of about 807 people.

References

External links
  Párnica Village website (in Slovak) with photos

Villages and municipalities in Dolný Kubín District